Acacia oraria, also commonly known as coastal wattle, is a shrub of the genus Acacia and the subgenus Plurinerves that is endemic to an area along the northeastern coast of Australia and on the islands of Flores and Timor.

Description
It has fissured fibrous bark and white scurfy branchlets. Like most species of Acacia it has phyllodes rather than true leaves.

Distribution
It is found in tropical areas of Australis and South East Asia including Flores in Indonesia and in Timor. It is found in areas close to the coast in Far North Queensland and north east Queensland in several disjunct populations.

Taxonomy
The species was first formally described by the botanist Ferdinand von Mueller in 1879 as a part of the work Fragmenta Phytographiae Australiae. It was reclassified as Racosperma orarium by Leslie Pedley in 1986 then returned to genus Acacia in 2006.

Uses
The tree is grown as a street tree or ornamental in Indonesia and is known to coppice quite well. It has a symbiotic relationship with some bacteria that form nodules on the roots and can fix nitrogen into the soil. As for most species of Acacia the bark contains quantities of tannins and are astringent and can be used to treat diarrhoea and dysentery.

See also
List of Acacia species

References

oraria
Flora of Queensland
Flora of Malesia
Flora of Java
Taxa named by Ferdinand von Mueller
Plants described in 1879
Flora of the Lesser Sunda Islands